Luis Ayala is a Chilean politician who has served as the Secretary General of the Socialist International since 1989 and was most recently re-elected in March 2017.  From 1973 to 1975 Ayala was the president of the International Union of Socialist Youth.

References

Radical Party of Chile politicians
Socialist International
Year of birth missing (living people)
Living people